Sofia Nicole Dador Harrison (born February 16, 1999) is a Filipino footballer who most recently played as a left back for Frauen-Bundesliga club Werder Bremen. Born in the United States, she represents the Philippines women's national team.

Early life
Harrison was born in Montgomery County, Maryland and raised in Columbia, Maryland. She has attended the Atholton High School.

College career
Harrison has attended the Slippery Rock University.

Club career

Coppermine United
Harrison has played for Coppermine United in the United States' United Women's Soccer league.

Werder Bremen
On September 1, 2022, it was announced that Harrison has signed up for Frauen-Bundesliga club Werder Bremen. She left the club in December after three Bundesliga squad call-ups and one appearance in a friendly match.

International career
In 2018, Harrison received her first call-up for the Philippines in the 2018 AFF Women's Championship.

Harrison has represented the Philippines at the 2022 AFC Women's Asian Cup qualification.

Career statistics
Scores and results list the Philippines' goal tally first, score column indicates score after each Harrison goal.

Honours
Philippines
Southeast Asian Games third place: 2021
AFF Women's Championship: 2022

References

External links

1999 births
Living people
Citizens of the Philippines through descent
Filipino women's footballers
Women's association football fullbacks
Philippines women's international footballers
Sportspeople from Montgomery County, Maryland
Soccer players from Maryland
People from Columbia, Maryland
Sportspeople from the Baltimore metropolitan area
American women's soccer players
College women's soccer players in the United States
Slippery Rock University of Pennsylvania alumni
United Women's Soccer players
American sportspeople of Filipino descent
Southeast Asian Games bronze medalists for the Philippines
Southeast Asian Games medalists in football
Competitors at the 2021 Southeast Asian Games
Filipino expatriate sportspeople in Germany
American expatriate soccer players in Germany
Expatriate women's footballers in Germany
Filipino expatriate footballers
American expatriate women's soccer players